Saint-Ferréol-les-Neiges is a municipality in Quebec, Canada.

History
First explored in 1693 by Louis Soumande (1652-1706) during a hunting expedition, the first settlers came in 1728 when some families were invited to settle there at the invitation of the area's seigneurial lords, also the leaders of the Seminary of Quebec. In 1801, the Parish of Saint-Ferréol was formed out of the parishes of Saint-Joachim and Sainte-Anne-de-Beaupré, named after Jean Lyon de Saint-Ferréol (1692-1744), vicar to the Bishop of Quebec.

In 1845, the municipality was first founded, abolished in 1847, and reestablished in 1855 as the Parish Municipality of Saint-Féréol. In 1969, it changed status and was renamed to Municipality of Saint-Feréol-les-Neiges. Les-Neiges (French for "snow") was added to highlight the good snow conditions of nearby Mont-Sainte-Anne and the resulting prosperity. In 1978, the spelling of its name was corrected by adding the extra "r".

Demographics
Population trend:
 Population in 2021: 3806 (2016 to 2021 population change: 17.5%)
 Population in 2016: 3240 (2011 to 2016 population change: 9.3%)
 Population in 2011: 2964 (2006 to 2011 population change: 16.4%)
 Population in 2006: 2546 (2001 to 2006 population change: 26.4%)
 Population in 2001: 2014
 Population in 1996: 2219
 Population in 1991: 1995

Private dwellings occupied by usual residents: 1,606 (total dwellings: 2,696)

Mother tongue:
 English as first language: 1.7%
 French as first language: 95.8%
 English and French as first language: 1.3%
 Other as first language: 1.1%

See also
 List of municipalities in Quebec

References

External links

Incorporated places in Capitale-Nationale
Municipalities in Quebec